This article documents all the events in the sport of darts over the course of 2010.

PDC

Ladbrokes.com World Darts Championship

Coral.co.uk Players Championship

Premier League

Rileys Dart Zones UK Open

Stan James World Matchplay

PartyPoker.net European Championship

Bodog.com World Grand Prix

PDC Pro Tour

(All matches – best of 11 legs)

Players Championships
Gibraltar, February 6: Colin Lloyd 6–2 Wayne Jones
Gibraltar, February 7: Denis Ovens 6–5 Gary Anderson
Swindon, February 20: Mervyn King 6–3 Andy Hamilton
Derby, February 27: Phil Taylor 6–1 Terry Jenkins
Gladbeck, Germany, March 6: Vincent van der Voort 6–2 Wayne Jones
Gladbeck, Germany, March 7: Adrian Lewis 6–4 Mark Walsh
Wigan, March 13: Phil Taylor 6–0 Mark Dudbridge
Crawley, March 20: Barrie Bates 6–5 Denis Ovens
Barnsley, April 10: Simon Whitlock 6–4 Gary Anderson
Derby, April 17: Simon Whitlock 6–4 Colin Lloyd
Wigan, April 24: Wes Newton 6–2 Andy Smith
Wigan, May 8: Simon Whitlock 6–0 Andy Hamilton
Salzburg, Austria, May 15: Simon Whitlock 6–4 Steve Beaton
Salzburg, Austria, May 16: Phil Taylor 6–4 Simon Whitlock
Barnsley, June 12: Gary Anderson 6–1 Mark Walsh
Barnsley, June 13: Ronnie Baxter 6–5 Denis Ovens
Haarlem, Netherlands, June 19: Vincent van der Voort 6–5 Wayne Jones
Haarlem, Netherlands, June 20: Andy Smith 6–4 Alan Tabern
Las Vegas, Nevada, USA, June 27: Phil Taylor 6–3 Denis Ovens
Las Vegas, Nevada, USA, June 28: Gary Anderson 6–4 Simon Whitlock
Las Vegas, Nevada, USA, June 29: Co Stompé 6–3 James Wade
Revesby, Australia, August 22: Dennis Priestley 6–3 Mark Hylton
London, Ontario, Canada, August 28: Jamie Caven 6–4 Michael van Gerwen
London, Ontario, Canada, August 29: Colin Lloyd 6–1 Jamie Caven
Crawley, September 4: Adrian Lewis 6–4 Steve Farmer
Crawley, September 5: Colin Lloyd 6–4 Simon Whitlock
Nuland, Netherlands, September 18: James Wade 6–4 Terry Jenkins
Nuland, Netherlands, September 19: Steve Farmer 6–4 Kevin Painter
Dublin, October 2: Simon Whitlock 6–1 Dennis Priestley
Dublin, October 3: Jamie Caven 6–5 Ronnie Baxter
Killarney, October 17: Gary Anderson 6–1 Dennis Smith
Bad Nauheim, October 23: Mark Webster 6–4 Richie Burnett
Bad Nauheim, October 24: Simon Whitlock 6–4 Richie Burnett
Barnsley, November 6: Wes Newton 6–3 Colin Lloyd
Barnsley, November 7: Wes Newton 6–1 Mark Webster
Derby, November 26: Phil Taylor 6–3 Mark Walsh
Derby, November 27: Mark Walsh 6–4 Phil Taylor

UK Open Regional Finals
Qualifier 1 (Swindon, February 21): Mervyn King 6–1 Simon Whitlock
Qualifier 2 (Derby, February 8): Mark Walsh 6–2 Phil Taylor
Qualifier 3 (Wigan, March 14): Phil Taylor 6–0 Jamie Caven
Qualifier 4 (Crawley, March 21): Gary Anderson 6–5 Wesley Newton
Qualifier 5 (Barnsley, April 11): Mark Walsh 6–3 John Part
Qualifier 6 (Derby, April 18): Phil Taylor 6–2 Peter Wright
Qualifier 7 (Wigan, April 25): Colin Lloyd 6–3 Colin Osborne
Qualifier 8 (Wigan, May 9): James Wade 6–2 Gary Anderson

Other PDC tournaments

BDO/WDF

Lakeside World Darts Championship

WDF Europe Cup

Winmau World Masters

WDF Category 1 Events

Dutch Open at NH Hotel/Congress centre, Veldhoven, February 7
Quarter-Finals (Losers €500, Best of 7 legs) Ross Montgomery 4–0 Patrick Loos, Scott Waites 4–1 Paul Gibbs, Steve Douglas 4–1 Edwin Max, Martin Adams 4–1 Steve West
Semi-Finals (Losers €1,250, Best of 3 sets, 5 legs per set) Scott Waites 4–0 Ross Montgomery, Martin Adams 2–0 Steve Douglas
Final (Winner €4,500 Runner-up €2,250, Best of 5 sets, 5 legs per set) Martin Adams 3–1 Scott Waites

Scottish Open at Normandy Cosmopolitan Hotel, Renfrew, February 21
Quarter-Finals (Losers £100, Best of 7 legs) Stuart Kellett 4–1 Ian Lilley, Remco van Eijden 4–2 Gary Robson, Jamie Lewis 4–0 Paul Telford, Dennis te Kloese 4–2 Garry Thompson
Semi-Finals (Losers £300, Best of 9 legs) Stuart Kellett 5–2 Remco van Eijden, Dennis te Kloese 5–1 Jamie Lewis
Final (Winner £2,000 Runner-up £800, Best of 11 legs) Stuart Kellett 6–3 Dennis te Kloese

German Open in Bochum, April 17. Matches played in sets, three legs per set.
Quarter-Finals (Losers €240) Ross Smith 2–1 Joey ten Berge, Ronny Huybrechts 2–1 Rob Radsma, Gary Robson 2–0 Fabian Roosenbrand, Dean Winstanley 2–1 Jan Dekker
Semi-Finals (Losers €480) Ronny Huybrechts 2–0 Ross Smith, Dean Winstanley 2–1 Gary Robson
Final (Winner €2,400 Runner-up €1,200) Dean Winstanley 3–2 Ronny Huybrechts

British Open at The Spa, Bridlington, September 18
Quarter-Finals (Losers £150, Best of 5 legs) Paul Harvey 3–1 Barry Davies, Andrew Gilding 3–0 Scott Waites, Ted Hankey 3–1 Andy Beardmore, Ian Jones 3–0 Kevin Harris
Semi-Finals (Losers £400, Best of 3 sets, 5 legs per set) Andrew Gilding 2–0 Paul Harvey, Ted Hankey 2–1 Ian Jones
Final (Winner £3,000 Runner-up £1,000, Best of 5 sets, 5 legs per set) Ted Hankey 3–0 Andrew Gilding

WDF Category 2 Events

German Gold Cup, January 24 (Winner €800, Runner-up €400) Vladimir Andersen  3–1  Tobias Muller
Isle of Man Open, March 14 (Winner £5,000, Runner-up £1,500) Dave Prins  3–0  Joey ten Berge
Mariflex Open, March 21 (Winner €2,500, Runner-up €1,000) John Henderson  3–2  Steve West
Virginia Beach Dart Classic, March 28 (Winner $1,200, Runner-up $600) Jerry van Loan  beat  Jim Widmayer
Antwerp Open, April 4 (Winner €2,500, Runner-up €1,000) Stuart Kellett  3–2  Gino Vos
Dortmund Open, May 16 Robert Wagner  beat  Davyd Venken
BDO International Open, June 13 (Winner £3,000, Runner-up £700) Martin Adams  4–1  Gary Robson
Canadian Open, June 20 (Winner C$1,000, Runner-up C$500) Terry Hayhurst  5–3  Troy Hanlon
New Zealand Masters, June 20 Peter Hunt  5–3  Bernie Smith
England Open, June 27 (Winner £3,000, Runner-up £1,000) Dean Winstanley  5–2  Mark Harris
England Masters, July 18 (Winner £1,200, Runner-up £600) John Walton  5–3  Dean Winstanley
British Classic, July 24 (Winner £3,000, Runner-up £500) Ross Montgomery  2–0  Stuart Kellett
Pacific Masters, July 24 (Winner A$1,100, Runner-up A$600) Beau Anderson  6–4  Bill Stanley
New Zealand Open, August 4 (Winner NZ$1,500, Runner-up NZ$700) Peter Hunt  5–0  Sonny Harris
Belgium Open, August 8 (Winner €2,500, Runner-up €1,200) Dean Winstanley  3–2  Tony O'Shea
WDF Americas Cup Singles, August 24 Chuck Pankow  4–3  Gary Mawson
England Classic, September 26 (Winner £2,500, Runner-up £1,000) Stephen Bunting  6–0  Tony West
Japan Open, October 17 (Winner ¥70,000, Runner-up ¥30,000) Katsuya Aiba  beat  Yuichi Okiyama
Northern Ireland Open, November 6 (Winner £1,600, Runner-up £750) Robbie Green  3–0  Ewan Hyslop
WDF Asia-Pacific Cup Singles, November 6 Koha Kokiri  4–1  Morihiro Hashimoto
Czech Open, November 7 Scott Waites  6–2  Dean Winstanley
Flanders Open, November 14 (Winner €2,500, Runner-up €1,000) Fabian Roosenbrand  beat  Kim Huybrechts

External links
2010 PDC Calendar
2010 BDO Calendar
2010 WDF Calendar